The Cedars, also known as the T. E. Browne House, is a historic home located near Murfreesboro, Hertford County, North Carolina.  It was built about 1830, and is a two-story, Federal style frame dwelling with a hip roof.  The front facade features a pedimented double portico supported by eight tapered columns.  Also on the property are a contributing outbuilding and plank smokehouse.

It was listed on the National Register of Historic Places in 1983.

References

Houses on the National Register of Historic Places in North Carolina
Federal architecture in North Carolina
Houses completed in 1830
Houses in Hertford County, North Carolina
National Register of Historic Places in Hertford County, North Carolina
1830 establishments in North Carolina
Buildings and structures in Murfreesboro, North Carolina